Felix Andries Vening Meinesz (30 July 1887 – 10 August 1966) was a Dutch geophysicist and geodesist. He is known for his invention of a precise method for measuring gravity (gravimetry). Thanks to his invention, it became possible to measure gravity at sea, which led him to the discovery of gravity anomalies above the ocean floor. He later attributed these anomalies to continental drift. He was a Fellow of the Royal Society.

Biography 
Vening Meinesz's father, Sjoerd Anne Vening Meinesz, was mayor, first of Rotterdam, then of Amsterdam. Felix was born in The Hague grew up in a protected environment. In 1910 he graduated in civil engineering in Delft. The same year he started working for the Dutch gravity survey. In 1915 he wrote his dissertation on the defects of the gravimeters used at that time.

Vening Meinesz then designed a new gravimeter, which the KNMI (Royal Dutch Meteorological Institute) built. The apparatus has two pendula of the same size hanging in a frame but moving in opposite phases. With mirrors and lightbeams the difference in amplitude of the two pendula is captured on a film. Vening Meinesz had discovered that horizontal accelerations (as by waves on a boat) had no influence on the difference in amplitude between the two pendula. The recorded difference then is the amplitude of a theoretical, undisturbed pendulum. Now it became possible to measure gravity more accurately. Vening Meinesz started with measuring gravity all over the Netherlands, for which a network of 51 monitoring stations was created. This became a success, which encouraged him to do measurements at sea. A perfected gravimeter, hanging in a 'swing', was designed. The experiment was successful.

Now measuring gravity at sea had become possible. Between 1923 and 1929 the tall (over 2 metres) Vening Meinesz embarked in small submarines for some uncomfortable expeditions. His goal was to establish the exact shape of the geoid and the Earth. When his expedition with the submarine Hr. Ms. K XVIII was made into a movie in 1935, Vening Meinesz became a hero of the Dutch cinema public. Besides, his research was in the international scientific spotlight. In 1927 he became a part-time professor in geodesy, cartography and geophysics at Utrecht University, and in 1937 he became professor at the Delft University of Technology as well. In 1927 he became member of the Royal Netherlands Academy of Arts and Sciences. He was awarded the Howard N. Potts Medal in 1936.

In World War II, Vening Meinesz was involved in the Dutch resistance. After the war he could take up his tasks as a professor again. From 1945 to 1951 he was the director of the KNMI. From 1948 to 1951, Vening Meinesz was President of the International Union of Geodesy and Geophysics. He retired in 1957, and died in Amersfoort in 1966.

Research and discoveries
The vast amounts of data that his expeditions yielded were analyzed and discussed together with other leading Dutch Earth scientists of the time J.H.F. Umbgrove, B.G. Escher and Ph.H. Kuenen, the results were published in 1948. An important result was the discovery of elongated belts of negative gravity anomalies along the oceanic trenches. The mean gravity force appeared to be the same on land and at sea, which was in agreement with the principle of isostasy. Vening Meinesz was especially intrigued by the oceanic trenches. The coexistence of active volcanism, large negative gravity anomalies and the sudden difference in terrain elevation could only be explained by assuming the Earth's crust was somehow pushed together at these places. As a geophysicist, he was prejudiced that the crust was too rigid to deform at that scale in such a way. His discoveries could be explained only with the development of the theory of plate tectonics in the 1950s.

Submarine expeditions
Vening Meinesz measured the gravity field of the Earth with his pendulum apparatus on board several submarines. The following expeditions are described in his publications, "Gravity Expeditions at Sea"

Vol 1: 1923–1930 
 HNLMS K II (1923)
 HNLMS K XI (1925)
 HNLMS K XIII (1926–1927)
 HNLMS K XIII (1928–1930)

Vol II: 1923–1933 
 HNLMS O 13 (1932)

Vol III: 1934–1939 
 HNLMS K XVIII (1934–1935)
 HNLMS O 16 (1937)
 HNLMS O 12 (1937)
 HNLMS O 13 (1938)
 HNLMS O 19 (1939)

Vening Meinesz was not on board during expeditions after 1939. His experiments were performed by his students.
Vol V: 1948–1958 
 HNLMS O 24 (1948 - 1949)
 HNLMS Tijgerhaai (1951)
 HNLMS Walrus (1957)
 HNLMS Vos (1955)
 HNLMS Zeeleeuw (1956)
 HNLMS Fret (1957)

Legacy 
Named after him are:
 a gravimeter, an apparatus to measure gravity
 a mathematical function used in geodesy
 a medal of the European Geophysical Society/European Geosciences Union
 a research school at Utrecht University
 the crater Vening Meinesz on the Moon.

See also
 List of geophysicists

References

Bibliography

External links
 Vening Meinesz Research School of Geodynamics at Utrecht University
 Some downloadable (pdf scanned) publications by FA Vening Meinesz
 EGU Vening Meinesz Medal

1887 births
1966 deaths
20th-century Dutch geologists
Geophysicists
20th-century Dutch inventors
Academic staff of the Delft University of Technology
Wollaston Medal winners
Scientists from The Hague
Penrose Medal winners
Foreign Members of the Royal Society
Foreign associates of the National Academy of Sciences
Members of the Royal Netherlands Academy of Arts and Sciences
Delft University of Technology alumni
Howard N. Potts Medal recipients
Geodesists
Presidents of the International Union of Geodesy and Geophysics